Robert True Donnelly (1924-1999) was a judge on the Missouri Supreme Court from 1965 until 1988, and the chief justice of that same court twice, from 1973 to 1975 and again from 1981 to 1983.  He was educated at the public schools of Tulsa, Oklahoma and also did graduate work at the University of Tulsa.  During his 23 years on the court, he authored 546 opinions.  While Chief Justice, he drew headlines by criticizing the Supreme Court of the United States for interpreting the U.S. Constitution beyond what the Founding Fathers "had envisioned."  He also claimed that modern education was failing because it didn't "teach religious and moral values." He once called the Miranda Rule, "an example of tipping the balance in favor of the accused."

Sources

1924 births
1999 deaths
Politicians from Tulsa, Oklahoma
Judges of the Supreme Court of Missouri
University of Missouri alumni
20th-century American judges
Lawyers from Tulsa, Oklahoma
20th-century American lawyers
Chief Justices of the Supreme Court of Missouri